The 1967 Tasmanian Australian National Football League (TANFL) premiership season was an Australian Rules football competition staged in Hobart, Tasmania over nineteen (19) roster rounds and four (4) finals series matches between 1 April and 16 September 1967.

Participating Clubs
Clarence District Football Club
Glenorchy District Football Club
Hobart Football Club
New Norfolk District Football Club
North Hobart Football Club
Sandy Bay Football Club

1967 TANFL Club Coaches
John Bingley (Clarence)
Bobby Parsons (Glenorchy)
John Watts (Hobart)
Trevor Leo (New Norfolk)
John Devine (North Hobart)
Ray Giblett (Sandy Bay)

TANFL Reserves Grand Final
New Norfolk 12.6 (78) v Clarence 8.14 (62) – North Hobart Oval

TANFL Under-19's Grand Final
(Saturday, 30 September 1967)
Nth Hobart 6.5 (41) v New Norfolk 2.10 (22) – North Hobart Oval

State Preliminary Final
(Saturday, 23 September 1967)
Nth Hobart 18.8 (116) v East Launceston 8.17 (65) – Att: 8,444 at North Hobart Oval
Note: North Hobart (TANFL guernseys) and East Launceston (NTFA guernseys) wore alternate strips due to a guernsey clash.

State Grand Final
(Saturday, 30 September 1967) – (See:1967 Tasmanian State Premiership Final)
 Wynyard: 1.1 (7) | 9.7 (61) | 10.9 (69) | 13.14 (92)
Nth Hobart:  3.8 (26) | 5.11 (41) | 11.17 (83) | 12.19 (91)
Attendance: 8,289 at West Park Oval
Note: This match was abandoned and officially declared as "No Result" due to a ground invasion by spectators.

Intrastate Matches
Jubilee Shield (Saturday, 6 May 1967)
TANFL 11.17 (83) v NWFU 10.8 (68) – Att: 4,635 at Devonport Oval

Jubilee Shield (Saturday, 3 June 1967)
TANFL 18.10 (118) v NTFA 11.13 (79) – Att: 13,415 at North Hobart Oval

Inter-Association Match (Sunday, 4 June 1967)
TANFL 15.14 (104) v WTFA 11.10 (76) – Att: 2,000 at Queenstown Oval

Inter-Association Match (Saturday, 17 June 1967)
Huon FA 15.14 (104) v TANFL 14.15 (99) – Att: 20,142 at North Hobart Oval (Curtain-Raiser)

Interstate Match
Interstate Match (Saturday, 17 June 1967)
Victoria 13.16 (94) v Tasmania 11.11 (77) – Att: 20,142 at North Hobart Oval

Leading Goalkickers: TANFL
David Collins (Nth Hobart) – 53
Brent Palfreyman (Sandy Bay) – 45
Alan Besier (New Norfolk) – 42
Darrel West (Glenorchy) – 42
Burnie Payne (Hobart) – 35

Medal Winners
John Richmond (Clarence) – William Leitch Medal
Robert "Boy" Wilton (New Norfolk) – George Watt Medal (Reserves)
G.Barnes (New Norfolk) – V.A Geard Medal (Under-19's)
Ron Marney (Glenorchy) – Weller Arnold Medal (Best player in Intrastate matches)

1967 TANFL Ladder

Round 1
(Saturday, 1 April 1967)
Nth Hobart 15.5 (95) v Clarence 13.16 (94) – Att: 6,442 at North Hobart Oval
Sandy Bay 15.8 (98) v Hobart 12.20 (92) – Att: 4,802 at Queenborough Oval
New Norfolk 7.13 (55) v Glenorchy 7.13 (55) – Att: 3,975 at Boyer Oval

Round 2
(Saturday, 8 April 1967)
New Norfolk 17.18 (120) v Clarence 10.14 (74) – Att: 4,415 at North Hobart Oval
Hobart 16.20 (116) v Nth Hobart 5.17 (47) – Att: 3,546 at TCA Ground
Glenorchy 18.12 (120) v Sandy Bay 7.10 (52) – Att: 4,146 at KGV Park

Round 3
(Saturday, 15 April 1967)
Glenorchy 19.13 (127) v Nth Hobart 11.10 (76) – Att: 5,844 at North Hobart Oval
Clarence 9.12 (66) v Hobart 8.5 (53) – Att: 3,899 at Bellerive Oval
New Norfolk 16.5 (101) v Sandy Bay 14.11 (95) – Att: 3,849 at Queenborough Oval

Round 4
(Saturday, 22 April & Tuesday, 25 April 1967)
Clarence 13.5 (83) v Sandy Bay 9.14 (68) – Att: 6,695 at North Hobart Oval
New Norfolk 9.19 (73) v Nth Hobart 5.4 (34) – Att: 2,562 at Boyer Oval
Glenorchy 14.12 (96) v Hobart 9.11 (65) – Att: 5,550 at North Hobart Oval (Tuesday)

Round 5
(Saturday, 29 April 1967)
Sandy Bay 10.18 (78) v Nth Hobart 8.10 (58) – Att: 4,431 at North Hobart Oval
New Norfolk 10.16 (76) v Hobart 10.8 (68) – Att: 2,882 at TCA Ground
Glenorchy 9.8 (62) v Clarence 7.11 (53) – Att: 4,991 at KGV Park

Round 6
(Saturday, 6 May 1967)
Hobart 11.18 (84) v Sandy Bay 10.12 (72) – Att: 3,381 at North Hobart Oval
Clarence 9.19 (73) v Nth Hobart 11.7 (73) – Att: 2,531 at Bellerive Oval
New Norfolk 11.15 (81) v Glenorchy 8.15 (63) – Att: 3,881 at KGV Park

Round 7
(Saturday, 13 May 1967)
Hobart 16.9 (105) v Nth Hobart 11.25 (91) – Att: 6,235 at North Hobart Oval
Clarence 13.6 (84) v New Norfolk 8.15 (63) – Att: 2,798 at Boyer Oval
Glenorchy 10.9 (69) v Sandy Bay 6.7 (43) – Att: 3,506 at Queenborough Oval

Round 8
(Saturday, 20 May 1967)
Sandy Bay 11.9 (75) v New Norfolk 10.11 (71) – Att: 4,022 at North Hobart Oval
Glenorchy 15.9 (99) v Nth Hobart 9.12 (66) – Att: 4,017 at KGV Park
Clarence 13.12 (90) v Hobart 13.7 (85) – Att: 4,696 at TCA Ground

Round 9
(Saturday, 27 May 1967)
Nth Hobart 14.11 (95) v New Norfolk 11.17 (83) – Att: 3,621 at North Hobart Oval
Glenorchy 16.16 (112) v Hobart 8.12 (60) – Att: 3,133 at TCA Ground
Clarence 15.17 (107) v Sandy Bay 9.10 (64) – Att: 2,734 at Bellerive Oval

Round 10
(Saturday, 10 June & Monday, 12 June 1967)
Hobart 12.10 (82) v New Norfolk 9.16 (70) – Att: 3,684 at North Hobart Oval
Nth Hobart 16.15 (111) v Sandy Bay 12.15 (87) – Att: 2,846 at Queenborough Oval
Glenorchy 14.12 (96) v Clarence 12.8 (80) – Att: 8,840 at North Hobart Oval (Monday) *
Note: This was the highest roster match attendance in both TANFL and Tasmanian football history.

Round 11
(Saturday, 24 June 1967)
Nth Hobart 16.16 (112) v Clarence 14.14 (98) – Att: 4,975 at North Hobart Oval
Sandy Bay 14.16 (100) v Hobart 11.12 (78) – Att: 2,676 at Queenborough Oval
New Norfolk 14.11 (95) v Glenorchy 13.12 (90) – Att: 3,469 at KGV Park

Round 12
(Saturday, 1 July 1967)
Glenorchy 11.10 (76) v Sandy Bay 9.7 (61) – Att: 2,138 at North Hobart Oval
Nth Hobart 8.11 (59) v Hobart 6.8 (44) – Att: 1,910 at TCA Ground
New Norfolk 9.14 (68) v Clarence 5.8 (38) – Att: 1,483 at Boyer Oval

Round 13
(Saturday, 8 July 1967)
Glenorchy 12.12 (84) v Nth Hobart 6.6 (42) – Att: 6,073 at North Hobart Oval
Sandy Bay 12.8 (80) v New Norfolk 7.11 (53) – Att: 2,765 at Queenborough Oval
Clarence 13.8 (86) v Hobart 11.5 (71) – Att: 2,557 at Bellerive Oval

Round 14
(Saturday, 15 July 1967)
Clarence 13.20 (98) v Sandy Bay 7.9 (51) – Att: 5,023 at North Hobart Oval
Glenorchy 14.11 (95) v Hobart 10.17 (77) – Att: 3,029 at KGV Park
Nth Hobart 13.13 (91) v New Norfolk 10.6 (66) – Att: 2,296 at Boyer Oval

Round 15
(Saturday, 22 July 1967)
Nth Hobart 13.9 (87) v Sandy Bay 11.9 (75) – Att: 4,490 at North Hobart Oval
New Norfolk 16.17 (113) v Hobart 7.9 (51) – Att: 1,836 at Boyer Oval
Glenorchy 8.19 (67) v Clarence 10.5 (65) – Att: 4,715 at KGV Park

Round 16
(Saturday, 29 July 1967)
New Norfolk 14.11 (95) v Glenorchy 12.11 (83) – Att: 5,250 at North Hobart Oval
Clarence 14.10 (94) v Nth Hobart 12.12 (84) – Att: 3,690 at Bellerive Oval
Sandy Bay 17.16 (118) v Hobart 16.15 (111) – Att: 1,908 at TCA Ground

Round 17
(Saturday, 5 August 1967)
Nth Hobart 17.18 (120) v Hobart 8.4 (52) – Att: 3,395 at North Hobart Oval
Sandy Bay 9.2 (56) v Glenorchy 6.13 (49) – Att: 3,082 at Queenborough Oval
Clarence 17.5 (107) v New Norfolk 10.11 (71) – Att: 4,328 at Bellerive Oval

Round 18
(Saturday, 12 August 1967)
Clarence 16.8 (104) v Hobart 14.15 (99) – Att: 3,292 at North Hobart Oval
Nth Hobart 8.11 (59) v Glenorchy 6.15 (51) – Att: 4,022 at KGV Park
New Norfolk 11.17 (83) v Sandy Bay 11.9 (75) – Att: 2,098 at Boyer Oval

Round 19
(Saturday, 19 August 1967)
Nth Hobart 14.10 (94) v New Norfolk 11.10 (76) – Att: 5,139 at North Hobart Oval
Clarence 14.15 (99) v Sandy Bay 9.16 (70) – Att: 2,946 at Queenborough Oval
Glenorchy 19.14 (128) v Hobart 5.15 (45) – Att: 2,280 at TCA Ground

First Semi Final
(Saturday, 26 August 1967)
Nth Hobart: 1.5 (11) | 3.11 (29) | 6.12 (48) | 9.12 (66)
New Norfolk: 1.4 (10) | 4.10 (34) | 7.12 (54) | 8.13 (61)
Attendance: 12,536 at North Hobart Oval

Second Semi Final
(Saturday, 2 September 1967)
Glenorchy: 0.3 (3) | 4.3 (27) | 5.11 (41) | 7.12 (54)
Clarence: 0.5 (5) | 1.6 (12) | 4.10 (34) | 6.14 (50)
Attendance: 12,235 at North Hobart Oval

Preliminary Final
(Saturday, 9 September 1967)
Nth Hobart: 0.1 (1) | 6.5 (41) | 9.7 (61) | 11.11 (77)
Clarence: 3.8 (26) | 3.15 (33) | 5.16 (46) | 8.20 (68)
Attendance: 14,584 at North Hobart Oval

Grand Final
(Saturday, 16 September 1967)
Nth Hobart: 3.3 (21) | 6.5 (41) | 9.8 (62) | 11.12 (78)
Glenorchy: 2.5 (17) | 2.12 (24) | 3.13 (31) | 8.16 (64)
Attendance: 17,523 at North Hobart Oval

Source: All scores and statistics courtesy of the Hobart Mercury and Saturday Evening Mercury (SEM) publications.

External links
 FullPointsFooty: 1967 State Grand Final - "Goalpost Final"

Tasmanian Football League seasons